Most snakes have a longitudinal groove on the underside of the head between large, paired chin shields and smaller gular scales. This is referred to as Mental groove.

See also
 Snake scales
 Gular scales

References

Snake anatomy